Frans Derks (1 November 1930 – 25 September 2020) was a Dutch football referee and sports executive.

Early years
Born in 1930 in Vaals, Limburg, Derks went to boarding school and studied mechanical engineering in Zürich. After graduation, he became crisis manager and director at a cleaning company. He also was a quizmaster, singer (he recorded a song with Willem van Hanegem) and writer.

Refereeing career
Active from the 1950s through the 1970s, Derks was a flamboyant and outspoken referee, known for wearing tight shorts during matches. He was much appreciated by Dutch players for not stopping matches too much and not showing many cards, cheekily declaring he had no space left in his shorts for cards. He claimed never to have refereed a match won by a German team, a promise he had made to his late father.

Sports executive
Derks was chairman of football club FC Dordrecht from 1995 until 2003 and he was member of the board at NAC Breda. He was also chairman of volleyball club Brevok between 1978 and 1994.

He was named Officer of the Order of Orange-Nassau in 2009 for all he did for football in the Netherlands.

Derks died after a short illness in Breda in September 2020.

References

External links

1930 births
2020 deaths
People from Vaals
Dutch football referees
Dutch football chairmen and investors
FC Dordrecht
Officers of the Order of Orange-Nassau
Sportspeople from Limburg (Netherlands)